Stadia may refer to:
 One of the plurals of stadium, along with "stadiums"
 The plural of stadion, an ancient Greek unit of distance, which equals to 600 Greek feet (podes).
 Stadia (Caria), a town of ancient Caria, now in Turkey
 Stadia mark, marks on a telescopic sight's reticle that permit stadiametric rangefinding or altitude measurements
 Stadia rod, a related surveying tool used with telescopic based survey instruments
 Stadiametric rangefinding, a way of measuring distance using a telescope and triangulation
 Helsinki Polytechnic Stadia, a multidisciplinary institution of higher education in Finland
 Google Stadia, a video game streaming service launched in 2019 and shut down in 2023

See also
 
 Stadion (disambiguation)
 Stadium (disambiguation)